{{Speciesbox
|image=Carex canariensis (03).jpg
|image_caption=At the Ecological-Botanical Garden of the University of Bayreuth
|image2=Carex canariensis (02).jpg
|image2_caption=Close-up of flowers
|genus=Carex
|species=canariensis
|authority=Kük.
|synonyms_ref=
|synonyms=Vignea canariensis (Kük.) Soják
}}Carex canariensis'' is a species of sedge in the family Cyperaceae, native to the island of Madeira and to the Canary Islands. Its chromosome number is 2n = 58.

References

canariensis
Flora of the Canary Islands
Flora of Madeira
Plants described in 1900
Taxa named by Georg Kükenthal